The Kappa Sigma Fraternity, Gamma Theta Chapter is a historic fraternity house in Moscow, Idaho. It was built in 1916 for the Kappa Sigma chapter at the University of Idaho. It was the first Kappa Sigma chapter established in the state of Idaho.

The house was designed in the Classical Revival architectural style. It has been listed on the National Register of Historic Places since September 3, 1996.

References

Residential buildings on the National Register of Historic Places in Idaho
National Register of Historic Places in Latah County, Idaho
Neoclassical architecture in Idaho
Residential buildings completed in 1916
University of Idaho
Kappa Sigma
Fraternity and sorority houses
University and college buildings on the National Register of Historic Places in Idaho